Juana Records was an American independent record label.  It was founded by musicians Clinton Harris and Frederick Knight in 1975, in Midfield, Alabama, United States, and distributed by TK Records.  Its only Top 40 hit single was the Billboard No. 1 ranked "Ring My Bell", written by Knight and performed by Anita Ward (Juana single 3422) in 1979.

See also
 List of record labels

References

External links
Juana Records @ Discogs.com

Defunct record labels of the United States